A Moment's Worth is an American rock band from The Bronx, New York consisting of Alex Bondarev, Anthony Albanese, Frank Quarto, Johnny Endico, Vin Gajeski and Nicola Terzulli.  The band was established in 2004 and has released four CDs - Ironic Last Words (2004), A Moment's Worth (2007),Sleepless (2008) and "Start Where You Are" (2010).

On May 15, 2009 the band announced that they had signed with In-n-Out Records for a special release in Japan of their upcoming album along with the Sleepless EP. In-n-Out has notably covered inspirational bands for AMW such as New Found Glory, Finch, Fenix TX, RX Bandits, Allister, Pulley, Armor For Sleep, and I Am The Avalanche.

History

Formation 
A Moment's Worth originally formed under the name Dibs on Anthony with Alex Bondarev on lead vocals and rhythm guitar, Anthony Albanese on lead guitar, Chris Ragone on bass and Frank Quarto on drums.  They assembled in elementary school and played as Dibs on Anthony until their first full-length release in 2004.  Shortly after the 2004 release, Ironic Last Words, bass player Chris Ragone left the band and Johnny Endico stepped in to take his place. Shortly after the 2004 release of Ironic Last Words, Chris Ragone parted ways with the band.

Nicola Terzulli, friend/producer/engineer joined as an additional guitarist in the summer of 2007.  This line up solidified their sound in second full-length release, self-titled A Moment's Worth.

Ironic Last Words 
The first full length, Ironic Last Words was produced and recorded by Nicola Terzulli in Bronx, NY. The self-released album initially sold over 3,000 copies through playing at local venues including the CBGB, The Continental and the Knitting Factory.

A Moment's Worth (Self-Titled) 
The second full length was produced/recorded by Nicola Terzulli and self-released by A Moment's Worth.  They had their first tour on April 13, 2008. On April 13, AMW packed and headed out on an East Coast tour down south.  They called it the "Imagine Tour."

The video was filmed almost entirely in the Bronx, features a large cast of Bronx Underground bands & friends, and tells the story of friends banding together and rescuing one another from various circumstances. Ray Zablocki was the director & producer. Kevin Schaefer did the cinematography.

Sleepless 

A Moment's Worth's most recent release was also produced/recorded by Nicola Terzulli and self-released by A Moment's Worth. It is also the first album recorded by A Moment's Worth that was made in a studio. They released the single at the First Lutheran Church in The Bronx.

"Start Where You Are" 
A Moment's Worth also has a recent release, which was released in August, 2010.

In May 2009 the band signed a major deal with In-n-Out Records that included a release of Sleepless and their upcoming album in Japan and it was later found that In-n-Out Records and A Moment's Worth cooperation was disintegrated after unknown economic troubles in In-n-Out Records' native Japan

A Moment's Worth has also released a single called " Confidant ". They made an appearance on BronxTalk to promote the upcoming single. Before the single was introduced, the band was featured on the cover of the New York Press in 2011. At the 2011 Elfenworks IHH Awards in San Francisco, their song Dedicate from Start Where You Are won the first-place prize and was honored and praised by actor Danny Glover.

Band members
Alex Bondarev, lead vocals
Anthony Albanese, guitar
Frank Quarto, drums, backing vocals
Johnny Endico, bass, backing vocals
Nicola Terzulli, guitar
Vin 'Envy' Gajeski, Keys

Discography

Full releases
Ironic Last Words (2004)
1 The Jump Off Summer
2 Out of Words
3 Given Up on Giving Up
4 Ironic Last Words
5 Bottlecap
6 To a Friend
7 Startled
8 Cross My Heart
9 Gift for Hope
10 All I Say
11 Staying Home from School
A Moment's Worth (2007)
1 I Doubt, Therefore, I Think
2 Regarding a Great Unrest
3 Fight or Flight
4 The Eternal Optimist
5 Memories, Meet Dynamite (Also called "Canvas")
6 Catalina
7 Drown
8 The Surgeon
9 A Sense of Purpose (The Comeback)
10 Still
11 I Think, Therefore, I Am
12 Hidden 1
13 Hidden 2
"Start Where You Are" (2010)
 1 A Place Where There Was...
 2 Start Where You Are
 3 Rule No. 1
 4 6 AM
 5 Favorite Song
 6 Push
 7 Of Gratitude
 8 Hero
 9 The Calling
 10 Dedicate
 11 ...Nowhere Left to Go
 12 Legacy
 13 Golden Blue (Bonus Track)
 14 Hero Reprise (Bonus Track)
 15 Hidden Track

Compilation appearances
"The Eternal Optimist" 1st track on Rock 4 Life Compilation (QuickStar Productions) (2008)
"The Surgeon" featured on Our Scene is Cooler Than Yours Compilation (Bronx Underground) (2006)
"Catalina" selected for The Best Indie Music of 2007 Compilation (Creative Records) (2007)

EPs
Sleepless (2008)
1 Unsound
2 Zero. Four. One.
3 Too Far, Too Long
4 Sleepless
5 My Lost Self
6 Exit With a Desperate Cry
7 Cross My Heart

Videography
"Cross My Heart" Live (2004)
"The Eternal Optimist" Live recording by FAMECAST (2007)
"The Eternal Optimist" (Official) (2008)
"Dedicate" (Official) (2011)

References

External links
 Official Website
 Sonic Bids Profile
 Featured on BMXINVASION website

Musical groups from Brooklyn
Musical groups established in 2004
Alternative rock groups from New York (state)
Pop punk groups from New York (state)